Help Me, Alien Father! is the earliest release from punk rock band Alien Father.

Track listing
"Alien Father"  – 1:30
"Gbacl Lravong"  – 2:43
"Phobus"  – 2:50
"Jeffrey"  – 2:18
"Hand Techniques"  – 1:29
"Alex The Indian"  – 2:19
"Sofa King"  – 3:12

Personnel
Dave Hallinger – guitar and vocals
Curtis Regian – bass guitar and synth
Mike Topley – drums

External links 
 Sons of Brothas

2006 EPs
Alien Father albums